John Deakin (1912–1972) was an English photographer.

John Deakin may also refer to:

 John Deakin (footballer) (born 1966), English footballer
 John Deakin (rowing) (born 1965), British coxswain